"Have Mercy Baby" is a popular rhythm and blues song, written by Billy Ward and Rose Marks, recorded by The Dominoes in Cincinnati, produced by Ralph Bass, and released by Federal Records in 1952. It was Number One on the R&B Charts for ten non consecutive weeks.

Description
Clyde McPhatter's roots were in the black church. The song is essentially the gospel song "Have Mercy, Jesus" sung in the call-and-response style of a gospel quartet, although it is in the straight twelve-bar blues form that gospel singers disdained. In the first chorus McPhatter simply follows the melody, but  subsequently he freely improvises in the gospel style with short but spectacular melismas, stringing out phrases to overlap the backup singers responses, interjecting screams and yeahs, shouting a gospel funk. The backup band lays down the rhythm and provides the expected tenor sax solo.

Impact
The Dominoes' version of "Have Mercy Baby" was the definitive rhythm and gospel record. Influenced by the group's lead singer Clyde McPhatter, its importance lies in that it was the first popular R&B recording highlighting passionate black gospel music features.

Cover versions
Other significant recordings of the song were made by: 
The Bobbettes (1960), whose version went to #66 on the Hot 100.
The Rivingtons (1962)
James Brown (1964), whose version charted #92 Pop.

References

Billy Ward and his Dominoes songs
Songs written by Billy Ward (singer)
Songs written by Rose Marks
1952 singles
1965 singles
James Brown songs
1952 songs
Federal Records singles
King Records (United States) singles